The 319th Special Operations Squadron was first activated in September 1944 as the 319th Troop Carrier Squadron (Commando) and served in the China-Burma-India Theater during World War II. It provided airlift support and conducted airborne drops and glider operations for Allied troops in Burma, central China, and French Indochina in the last year of World War II.

The squadron was activated in April 1962 at Hurlburt Field, Florida and deployed planes and crews from Hurlburt for special air warfare and civic actions missions, then trained aircrews on special operations airlift at England Air Force Base, Louisiana until being inactivated as the 319th Special Operations Squadron in June 1972.

On 1 October 2005, the squadron was again activated as part of an overall expansion of the Air Force Special Operations Command.  It operates the Pilatus U-28A Draco.

Mission
The 319th Special Operations Squadron mission is to provide intra-theater support for special operations forces and it is currently equipped with the U-28A Draco, a modified version of the Pilatus PC-12. The U-28A was selected for its versatile performance and ability to operate from short and unimproved runway surfaces.

History

World War II

The 319th was first activated in India as the 319th Troop Carrier Squadron (Commando) in September 1944.  The squadron served in the China-Burma-India Theater during World War II. It provided airlift support and flew aerial resupply missions in support of various commando units, such as Merrill's Marauders and the Chindits and conducted airborne drops and glider operations for Allied troops in Burma, central China, and French Indochina in the last year of World War II.  After the end of the war, the squadron moved to China, where it continued operations until October 1945.  In November 1945, the squadron returned on paper to India, but was not manned or equipped.  It was inactivated there in December 1945.

Vietnam War

The squadron was redesignated the 319th Troop Carrier Squadron, Commando, and organized at Hurlburt Field, Florida in April 1962.  The squadron initially operated Curtiss C-46 Commandos, but also Douglas C-47 Skytrains, and Helio U-10 Courier, and North American T-28 Trojans until moving to England Air Force Base, Louisiana in 1966.  The squadron frequently deployed crews and airplanes to Southeast Asia for civic action and counterinsurgency missions.

At England, the squadron concentrated on training United States and foreign aircrews with the Fairchild C-123 Provider.  It continued this mission after returning to Hurlburt three years later.  It was inactivated in 1972 as the Air Force reduced its size following United States withdrawal from the Vietnam War.

Present era
On 1 October 2005, the squadron was again activated as part of an overall expansion of the Air Force Special Operations Command. It was equipped with the U-28A Draco, a modified version of the Pilatus PC-12, able to operate from short and unimproved runway surfaces. The 319th provides airlift support to United States Army Special Forces, and provides intratheater support for special operations.

Lineage
 Constituted as the 319th Troop Carrier Squadron (Commando) on 9 August 1944
 Activated on 1 September 1944
 Redesignated 319th Troop Carrier Squadron on 29 September 1945
 Inactivated on 27 December 1945
 Redesignated 319th Troop Carrier Squadron, Commando and activated on 18 April 1962 (not organized)
 Organized on 27 April 1962
 Redesignated 319th Air Commando Squadron, Troop Carrier on 8 November 1964
 Redesignated 319th Air Commando Squadron, Tactical Airlift on 1 May 1967
 Redesignated 319th Special Operations Squadron on 8 July 1968
 Inactivated on 15 January 1972
 Activated on 1 October 2005

Assignments
 1st Air Commando Group, 1 September 1944
 69th Composite Wing, 2 September 1945
 Tenth Air Force, c. 27 September 1945 – 27 December 1945
 Tactical Air Command, 18 April 1962 (not organized)
 1st Air Commando Group (later 1st Air Commando Wing, 1st Special Operations Wing), 27 Apr 1962
 4410th Combat Crew Training Wing, 15 July 1969
 1st Special Operations Wing, 30 July 1969 – 15 January 1972
 16th Special Operations Group (later 1st Special Operations Group), 1 October 2005 – present

Stations

 Asansol, India, 1 September 1944 (operated from various forward bases in Burma, 4 December 1944 – 17 May 1945)
 Warazup, Burma, 27 May 1945
 Loping, China, 2 September 1945
 Hu Hsien, China, 7 October 1945
 India, c. 1 November 1945 – 27 December 1945
 Eglin Air Force Auxiliary Field No. 9 (Hurlburt Field), Florida, 27 April 1962
 England Air Force Base, Louisiana, 15 January 1966
 Eglin Air Force Auxiliary Field No. 9 (Hurlburt Field), Florida, 30 July 1969 – 15 January 1972
 Hurlburt Field, Florida, 1 October 2005 – present

Aircraft

 Douglas C-47 Skytrain, 1944–1945, 1962–1966
 Waco CG-4A, 1944–1945
 Curtiss C-46 Commando, 1962–1964
 Helio U-10 Courier, 1963–1966
 Fairchild C-123 Provider, 1963–1972
 North American T-28 Trojan, 1965
 Pilatus U-28A, 2005–present

Awards and campaigns

References

 Notes

Bibliography

External links
 319TH SPECIAL OPERATIONS SQUADRON Factsheet

319
Military units and formations established in 1944